Salivary gland tumours, also known as mucous gland adenomas or neoplasms, are tumours that form in the tissues of salivary glands. The salivary glands are classified as major or minor. The major salivary glands consist of the parotid, submandibular, and sublingual glands. The minor salivary glands consist of 800 to 1000 small mucus-secreting glands located throughout the lining of the oral cavity. Patients with these types of tumours may be asymptomatic.

Presentation
Salivary gland tumours usually present as a lump or swelling in the affected gland which may or may not have been present for a long time. The lump may be accompanied by symptoms of duct blockage (e.g. xerostomia). Usually, in their early stages it is not possible to distinguish a benign tumour from a malignant one. One of the key differentiating symptoms of a malignant growth is nerve involvement; for example, signs of facial nerve damage (e.g. facial palsy) are associated with malignant parotid tumours. Facial pain and paraesthesia are also very often associated with malignant tumours. Other red flag symptoms which may suggest malignancy and warrant further investigation are fixation of the lump to the overlying skin, ulceration and induration (hardening) of the mucosa.

Diagnosis

There are many diagnostic methods that can be used to determine the type of salivary gland tumour and if it is benign or malignant. Examples of diagnostic methods include:

Physical exam and history: An exam of the body to check general signs of health. The head, neck, mouth, and throat will be checked for signs of disease, such as lumps or anything else that seems unusual. A history of the patient's health habits and past illnesses and treatments will also be taken.

Endoscopy: A procedure to look at organs and tissues inside the body to check for abnormal areas. For salivary gland cancer, an endoscope is inserted into the mouth to look at the mouth, throat, and larynx. An endoscope is a thin, tube-like instrument with a light and a lens for viewing.

MRI or CT Scan: These tests can confirm the presence of a tumour. An MRI or CT Scan can also show whether metastasis has occurred.

Biopsy: The removal of cells or tissues so they can be viewed under a microscope by a pathologist to check for signs of cancer.

Fine needle aspiration (FNA) biopsy: The removal of tissue or fluid using a thin needle. An FNA is the most common type of biopsy used for salivary gland cancer, and has been shown to produce accurate results when differentiating between benign and malignant tumours.

Radiographs: An OPG (orthopantomogram) can be taken to rule out mandibular involvement. A chest radiograph may also be taken to rule out any secondary tumours.

Ultrasound: Ultrasound can be used to initially assess a tumour that is located superficially in either the submandibular or parotid gland. It can distinguish an intrinsic from an extrinsic neoplasm.  Ultrasonic images of malignant tumours include ill-defined margins. Furthermore, high resolution ultrasound can identify the exact tumour location within the parotid gland, its relationship to the retromandibular vein and assist surgical excision.

Classification

Due to the diverse nature of salivary gland tumours, many different terms and classification systems have been used. Perhaps the most widely used currently is that system proposed by the World Health Organization in 2005, which classifies salivary neoplasms as primary or secondary, benign or malignant, and also by tissue of origin. This system defines five broad categories of salivary gland neoplasms:

Benign epithelial tumors
 Pleomorphic adenoma
 Warthin's tumor
 Myoepithelioma
 Basal cell adenoma
 Oncocytoma
 Canalicular adenoma
 Lymphadenoma
 Sebaceous lymphadenoma
 Nonsebaceous lymphadenoma
 Ductal papilloma
 Inverted ductal papilloma
 Intraductal papilloma
 Sialadenoma papilliferum
 Cystadenoma
 Malignant epithelial tumors
 Acinic cell carcinoma
 Mucoepidermoid carcinoma
 Adenoid cystic carcinoma
 Polymorphous low-grade adenocarcinoma
 Epithelial-myoepithelial carcinoma
 Clear cell carcinoma, not otherwise specified
 Basal cell adenocarcinoma
 Sebaceous carcinoma
 Sebaceous lymphadenocarcinoma
 Cystadenocarcinoma
 Low-grade cribriform cystadenocarcinoma
 Mucinous adenocarcinoma
 Oncocytic carcinoma
 Salivary duct carcinoma
 Salivary duct carcinoma, not otherwise specified
 Adenocarcinoma, not otherwise specified
 Myoepithelial carcinoma
 Carcinoma ex pleomorphic adenoma
 Mammary analogue secretory carcinoma
 Carcinosarcoma
 Metastasizing pleomorphic adenoma
 Squamous cell carcinoma
 Large cell carcinoma
 Lymphoepithelial carcinoma
 Sialoblastoma
 Soft tissue tumors
 Hemangioma
 Hematolymphoid tumors
 Hodgkin lymphoma
 Diffuse large B-cell lymphoma
 Extranodal marginal zone B cell lymphoma
 Secondary tumors (i.e. a tumor which has metastasized to the salivary gland from a distant location)

Others, not included in the WHO classification above, include:

 Intraosseous (central) salivary gland tumors
 Hybrid tumors (i.e. a tumor displaying combined forms of histologic tumor types)
 Hybrid carcinoma
 Others
 Others
 Keratocystoma
 Sialolipoma

Treatment
Most patients with early-stage lesions that are resectable generally tend to undergo surgery as their initial therapeutic approach, whereas those with advanced or unresectable cancers tend to be treated with radiotherapy (RT) alone or chemoradiotherapy (CRT), which hampered the comparison of the efficacy of RT alone with that of surgery combined with adjuvant RT. But some effort had been made to reflect the role of surgery in salivary gland tumours.

Treatment may include the following:
 Surgery Complete surgical resection, with adequate free margins, is currently the mainstay treatment for salivary gland tumours. However elective treatment of the N0 neck region remains a controversial topic
 Radiotherapy If a salivary gland tumour is cancerous, Radiation Therapy may be necessary
Fast neutron therapy has been used successfully to treat salivary gland tumors, and has shown to be significantly more effective than photons in studies treating unresectable salivary gland tumors.
 Chemotherapy Currently little is known about the efficacy of chemotherapy in treating salivary gland tumours. Chemotherapy, which plays an important role in systemic therapy, is generally reserved for the palliative treatment of symptomatic locally recurrent and/or metastatic disease that is not amenable to further surgery or radiation. Conventional chemotherapy regimens, such as cisplatin and 5-FU or CAP (cisplatin, doxorubicin, and cyclophosphamide) are still utilized as first-line therapy for patients with advanced lesions.
Targeted Therapy - Due to the poor results with chemotherapy, it's urgent to explore novel therapeutic interventions for this disease. And great expectations have been put into individualized therapies: in particular, the EGF receptors family (EGFR and HER2), KIT and androgen receptors are the most commonly investigated molecular targets in SGCs. Their expression seems not to be linked to its pathogenetic role in the development of SGCs, but more to the histogenetic origin of the tumor cells. Various targeted agents, such as imatinib, cetuximab, gefitinib, trastuzumab, had been used for exploring new treatment for salivary gland tumours, but on account of the rare incidence of salivary gland tumours, the number of cases available on targeted therapy for analysis is relatively small.

Epidemiology 
Little is known about the total incidence of salivary gland tumours as most benign tumours go unrecorded in national cancer registries. The majority of salivary tumours are benign (65-70%). Within the parotid gland 75 - 80% of tumours are benign. Around 50% of the tumours found in the submandibular glands are benign. Sublingual gland tumours are very rare but if present, they are most likely to be malignant.
Saku et al. in 1997  and Venturi   in 2021, reported the causal role for ionizing radiation in salivary gland tumorigenesis, particularly for mucoepidermoid carcinoma.

In the United States, salivary gland cancers are uncommon with an incidence rate of 1.7 in 100000 between 2009 and 2013.

See also
 Head and neck cancer
 Salivary gland pathology

References

External links 
 Salivary gland cancer entry in the public domain NCI Dictionary of Cancer Terms

Rare cancers

Salivary gland pathology